The year 2022 in art involves various significant events.

Events
 February - Twenty five works by the Ukrainian painter Maria Prymachenko are believed to have been destroyed by a fire which consumed the Ivankiv Historical and Local History Museum (where they were housed) in Ivankiv, Kyiv Oblast, Ukraine during the Russian Invasion of Ukraine.
 April 9 - The Museum of Contemporary Art San Diego opens to the public after a five-year, $105 million overhaul.
 May - French authorities charge former President of the Louvre, Jean-Luc Martinez with money laundering in conjunction with an art trafficking case.
May 8 - The Andy Warhol  silk-screen painting Sage Blue Shot Marilyn (1964) sells at Christie's in New York City for $195.04  million (with fees) shattering the record  for a price paid at auction for a work by an American artist, besting the previous mark set by Jean-Michel Basquiat's 1982 painting Untitled which sold for $110,500,000 in 2017. It also became the most expensive 20th century artwork sold in a public sale. The buyer was the American art dealer Larry Gagosian.
May 14 - An original print of Man Ray's Le Violon d'Ingres sells  for $12.4 million US (with fees) at Christie's in New York City making it the most expensive photograph ever sold at auction.
May 31 - At the Louvre in Paris a male provocateur initially disguised as an elderly female art-goer in a wheelchair smears the bulletproof glass on top of the Mona Lisa by Leonardo da Vinci with cake. He later reveals that he believes that he was engaged in some sort of makeshift climate protest. The still unidentified 36 year old man was subsequently placed in psychiatric care.
June 23 - The Orlando Museum of Art in Orlando, Florida is raided by the FBI who seize 25 suspect paintings potentially fraudulently attributed to Jean-Michel Basquiat.  The museum's director, Aaron De Groft who staged the exhibition of the works at the art institution is fired five days later.
July 4 - The Hay Wain (completed 1821) by the English landscape painter John Constable (1776-1837), and regarded as his most famous image, is subjected to two Just Stop Oil protestors attaching their own modified "apocalyptic vision of the future" version of the painting to the original and gluing themselves to the frame. The National Gallery later reports that the surface varnish of the painting and its frame suffered minor damage.
October 9 - Two Extinction Rebellion activists glue themselves to Pablo Picasso’s Massacre in Korea painting at the National Gallery of Victoria in Melbourne.
October
On October 14 activists from Just Stop Oil throw tomato soup onto Vincent van Gogh’s Sunflowers at the National Gallery in London then glue themselves to the wall beneath the painting. Subsequently on October 23 in a second incident, German climate action activists at the Museum Barberini in Potsdam throw mashed potatoes onto the Claude Monet painting Grainstacks (1890) and then make similar statements and demands.
It is noted that Piet Mondrian's New York City I (1941) has been hung upside down since first being put on public display in 1945.
November 9 
 The Paul Allen collection is sold off at Christie's in New York City and shatters all previous records for proceeds from an auction of a singular art collection at more than $1.5 billion US. All funds are to be donated to Allen's philanthropic endeavors. Among the records set for prices for a work by an individual artist were $149.2 million US for Les Poseuses, Ensemble (Petite version) (1888) by the French Pointillist Georges Seurat, $138 million US for the painting La Montagne Sainte-Victoire by the French Post-Impressionist Paul Cézanne setting a new mark for a price paid for his work at auction, $104.6 million US for Birch Forest (1903) by the Austrian Symbolist Gustav Klimt setting an auction record for his work, and $11.5 million US for a 1905 print of a photograph by Edward Steichen, The Flatiron, a record for the photographer.
 A seven foot high statue of Queen Elizabeth II carved from eight tons of limestone is unveiled at York Minster cathedral by King Charles III and Camilla, Queen Consort during an official visit to Yorkshire in York, England.
December 3 - Sydney Modern Project a A$344 extension to the Art Gallery of NSW opens to the public.

Exhibitions
January 31 until June 5 - Charles Ray: Figure Ground at the Metropolitan Museum of Art in New York City.
February 3 until April 16 - Ed Kerns: Interconnected at Lafayette College in Easton, Pennsylvania.
February 11 until April 17 - Tomás Saraceno: Particular Matter(s) at The Shed at Hudson Yards in New York City.
February 11 until May 15 - Holbein: Capturing Character at the Morgan Library and Museum in New York City. 
February 17 until May 15 - Jacques Louis David: Radical Draftsman at the Metropolitan Museum of Art in New York City.
March 3 until April 14 - Dorothea Tanning: Doesn't the Paint Say it All at the Kasmin Gallery in New York City.
March 3 until July 24 - Bridget Riley: Perceptual Abstraction at the Yale Center for British Art at Yale University in New Haven, Connecticut.
April 11 until July 31 - Sean Scully: The Shape of Ideas at the Philadelphia Museum of Art in Philadelphia, Pennsylvania (originated at the Modern Art Museum of Fort Worth in Fort Worth, Texas).
May 5 until July 22 - Nicole Eisenman: Untitled (Show) at Hauser & Wirth in New York City.
May 5 into February 27, 2023 - Monet - Mitchell at the Louis Vuitton Foundation in Paris, France.
May 14 until October 2 - Nick Cave: Forothemore at the Museum of Contemporary Art, Chicago in Chicago, Illinois.
May 20 until October 16 - Marc Quinn: History Paintings + at the Yale Center for British Art at Yale University in New Haven, Connecticut.
May 22 until October 23 - Salman Toor: No Ordinary Love at the Baltimore Museum of Art in Baltimore, Maryland.
May 25 until September 11 -  Sam Gilliam: Full Circle at the Hirshhorn Museum and Sculpture Garden in Washington DC.
July 22 until January 8, 2023 - New York: 1962-1964 at The Jewish Museum in New York City.
September 23 until January 8, 2023 - Bernardo Bellotto. On the 300th Anniversary of the Painter’s Birthday at the Royal Castle in Warsaw.
October 18 until February 20, 2023 - Alex Katz: Gathering at the Solomon R. Guggenheim Museum in New York City.
October 18 until January 8, 2023 - Ugo Rondinone: The water is a poem, unwritten by the air, no. the earth is a poem, unwritten by the fire at the Petit Palais in Paris.
October 20 until January 22, 2023 - Cubism and the Trompe l’Oeil Tradition at the Metropolitan Museum of Art in New York City.
October 22 until April 9, 2023 - Frank Bowling's Americas at the Boston Museum of Fine Arts in Boston, Massachusetts.
October 27 until December 17 - Pawel Althamer: Polish Sculpture at Anton Kern Gallery in New York City.
Ongoing - Ricky Brown: Really Bad Portraits in Washington Square Park in New York City.

Works
Ferdi Alıcı - The Eye of Mexico in Mexico City, Mexico
William Behrends - Statue of Tom Seaver (permanently installed at Citi Field in Queens, New York)
Richard Bossons - Statue of Queen Elizabeth II at York Minster Cathedral in York, England
Sandy Brown - Earth Goddess (installed in St Austell, Cornwall)
Alex Da Corte - ROY G BIV (commissioned for and exhibited at the 2022 Whitney Biennial)
Denise Dutton - Statue of Mary Anning
Dmitry Iv - Shoot Yourself (sculpture) in Kyiv, Ukraine
Douglas Jennings - Statue of Margaret Thatcher (Grantham)
Samson Kambalu - Antelope (on the Fourth plinth, Trafalgar Square, London)
Robin Kid - God Bless our Broken Home
Eduardo Kobra - For the planet (mural on the side of the United Nations Headquarters in New York City)
Hew Locke - Procession (sculptural mixed-media assemblage instillation) in the Duveen Galleries of the Tate Britain in London
Jesse Pallotta - A Love Letter to Marsha
Allison Saar - Statue of Lorraine Hansberry
Basil Watson - National Windrush Monument

Awards

Film, television series, and plays 
Notre-Dame on Fire
The Andy Warhol Diaries
The Collaboration

Deaths
January 1
 Pierre Parsus, 100, French painter and illustrator 
 Calisto Tanzi, 83, Italian art collector and convicted fraudster
January 4 - Craig Ruddy, 53, Australian artist and Archibald Prize winner (COVID-19)
January 14 - Ricardo Bofill, 82, Spanish-Catalonian architect
January 15 - Hossein Valamanesh, 72, Iranian-Australian artist
January 16 
 Tova Berlinski, 106, Polish-born Israeli painter
 Alekos Fassianos, 86, Greek painter
 Andrei Mudrea, 67, Moldovan painter and plastic artist
January 31 - James Bidgood, 88, American filmmaker, photographer, and visual and performance  artist
February 7 - Dan Lacey, 61, American painter
February 10 - John Wesley, 93, American painter
February 12 - Carmen Herrera, 106, Cuban-born American artist
February 17 - John Scott, 71, Canadian artist
February 19 
Marino Golinelli, 101, Italian art collector
Dan Graham, 79, American artist
Jan Pieńkowski, 85, Polish-born British illustrator
February 22 - DeWain Valentine, 86, American sculptor
February 26 
Antonio Seguí, 88, Argentine cartoonist and painter
Srihadi Soedarsono, 90, Indonesian painter
February 27 - Nick Zedd, 63, American filmmaker and painter
March 1 - Conrad Janis, 94, American actor, art dealer, and son of Sidney Janis
March 13 - Albert Kresch, 99, American painter
March 18 - Budi Tek, 65, Indonesian art collector
March 28 - Mira Calix, 52, South African-born British visual artist and musician
March 29 - Ted Mooney, 70, American novelist and Art journalist (Art in America)
March 31 - Patrick Demarchelier, 78, French photographer
April 1 - Eleanor Munro, 94, American art critic, art historian, and writer
April 4 - 
Donald Baechler, 65, American painter
Jerry Uelsmann, 87, American photographer
April 6 - David McKee, 87, British illustrator
April 18 - Hermann Nitsch, 83, Austrian artist (Viennese Actionism)
April 21 - Cynthia Plaster Caster, 74, American artist
April 22 - Marcus Leatherdale, 69, Canadian photographer
April 23 - Enoch Kelly Haney, 81, American sculptor and painter
April 30 - Ron Galella 91, American photographer
May 7 - Suzi Gablik 87, American artist, and art critic
May 10 - Enrique Metinides, 88, Mexican crime photographer
May 15 - Knox Martin, 99, American painter
May 18 - Bob Neuwirth, 82, American Musician, singer-performer, and painter
May 22 - Miss.Tic, 66, French street artist
May 24 - David Datuna, 48, Georgian born American artist
May 27 - Claude Rutault, 80, French painter
June 5 - Christopher Pratt, 86, Canadian painter and printmaker
June 6 - Jacques Villeglé, 96, French mixed-media artist
June 8 - Paula Rego, 87, Portuguese-British visual artist
June 11 - Duncan Hannah, 69, American painter
June 12 
 Tarek Al-Ghoussein, 60, Kuwaiti visual and performance artist
 Heidi Horten, 81, Austrian art collector
June 15
June 15 - Juan Pablo Echeverri, 43, Colombian visual artist
June 15 - Arnold Skolnick, 85, American graphic artist
June 21 - Harvey Dinnerstein, 94, American artist
June 25 - Sam Gilliam, 88, American painter
June 26 - Margaret Keane, 94, American painter
July 2 - David Blackwood, 80, Canadian visual artist
July 9 
Matt King, 37, American visual artist, co-founder of Meow Wolf
Lily Safra, 87, Brazilian-Monegasque art collector
July 18 
Maya Attoun, 48, Israeli artist,
Claes Oldenburg, 93, Swedish-born American sculptor
July 22 - Emilie Benes Brzezinski, 90, American sculptor
July 25 - Jennifer Bartlett, 81, American painter
July 29 - Mary Obering, 85, American painter
August 2 - Velichko Minekov, 93, Bulgarian sculptor
August 5 - Issey Miyake, 84, Japanese fashion designer
August 9 - Raymond Briggs, 88, British author and illustrator
August 12 - Natalia LL, 85, Polish artist
August 13 - Marta Palau Bosch, 88, Spanish-born Mexican artist
August 14 - Dmitri Vrubel, 62, Russian painter
August 21 - Oliver Frey, 74, Swiss visual artist
August 24 - Lily Renée, 101, Austrian-born American comic book artist
August 25 - Charlie Finch, 68, American art critic (death announced on this date)
September 5 - Virginia Dwan, 90, American art dealer
September 8  
Jens Birkemose, 79, Danish painter
James Polshek, 92, American architect (Clinton Presidential Center, Brooklyn Museum)
September 13
 Jean-Luc Godard 91, French filmmaker
 Roxanne Lowit, 81, American fashion photographer
October 8 
 Brigida Baltar, 62, Brazilian visual artist 
 Billy Al Bengston, 88, American visual artist 
 Grace Glueck, 96, American art critic (The New York Times)
October 11 
Harold Garde, 99, American painter 
Angus Trumble, 58, Australian art curator and historian, director of the National Portrait Gallery of Australia (2014–2018) to (death announced on this date)
October 16 - Jüri Arrak, 85, Estonian painter
October 17 - Jagoda Buić, 92, Croatian visual artist
October 21 - Peter Schjeldahl, 80, American art critic (The New Yorker, The New York Times, ARTnews) and poet
October 22 - Rodney Graham, 73, Canadian visual artist
October 24 - Laila Shawa, 82, Palestinian visual artist
October 26 - Pierre Soulages, 102, French visual artist
November 2 - Nicholas Harding, 66, English-born Australian painter, Archibald Prize winner (2001)
November 7 - Brian O'Doherty, 94, Irish American artist and art critic
November 8 - Lee Bontecou, 91, American sculptor
November 10 - Hervé Télémaque, 85, Haitian-born French painter
November 28 - Tom Phillips, 85, English artist (A Humument)
November 30 - Ashley Bickerton, 63, Barbadian-born American artist
December 3 - Larry Qualls, American art editor and documentarian
December 7 - Ronald Sherr, 70, American portrait artist
December 9 - Judith Lauand, 100, Brazilian painter and printmaker
December 17 - Philip Pearlstein, 98, American painter
December 20 - Maya Widmaier-Picasso, 87, French art curator
December 21 - Franz Gertsch, 92, Swiss painter
December 26 - Dorothy Iannone, 89, American visual artist
December 28 
Arata Isozaki, 91, Japanese architect  (Kitakyushu Municipal Museum of Art, MOCA, Nagi Museum Of Contemporary Art)
Tony Vaccaro, 100, American photographer

References

 
2022 in the arts
2020s in art
Years of the 21st century in art
2022-related lists
Art
Culture-related timelines by year